Yunlin is a high speed rail station in Huwei Township, Yunlin County, Taiwan served by Taiwan High Speed Rail.

History
05 January 2007: The segment from Banqiao to Zuoying opened for service, but not including Yunlin station.
01 December 2015: Yunlin station, along with Changhua and Miaoli stations, open for service.

Overview
The elevated station has two side platforms. It was opened on 1 December 2015. In March 2011, three planned roads to serve the station were cancelled due to land subsidence in the area, possibly due to overpumping of underground water.

HSR services
The station is mostly served by 8xx trains which stop at all stations on the Taiwan High Speed Rail. In addition, Southbound Service 583 which departs from Taichung and Northbound Service 598 which terminates at Taichung also call at this station. The station is also served by a few (1)3xx semi-express trains.

Transfer to downtown
Yunlin HSR station, along with Changhua and Chiayi HSR stations, are currently the only three HSR stations with no additional rail service. Thus, Douliu railway station cannot be accessed by TRA services, but only by bus.

Around the station
 Huwei Science Park of Central Taiwan Science Park
 NTU Hospital Huwei Campus
 National Formosa University new campus.

See also

 List of railway stations in Taiwan

References

Railway stations served by Taiwan High Speed Rail
Railway stations in Yunlin County
2015 establishments in Taiwan